Trace Dempsey Cyrus (born Neil Timothy Helson; February 24, 1989) is an American musician. The son of country singer Billy Ray Cyrus and brother of recording artists Miley Cyrus and Noah Cyrus, he is the backing vocalist and guitarist of the band Metro Station, with time out between 2010 and 2014. In 2010, he began providing vocals and guitar in the pop rock band Ashland HIGH. He also owns the clothing company From Backseats to Bedrooms.

Early life 
Cyrus was born in Ashland, Kentucky, as Neil Timothy Helson. His mother is Leticia "Tish" Cyrus. His biological father is Baxter Neal Helson. He was adopted at age four by Billy Ray Cyrus, his mother's second husband, and lived with them part of the time in Thompson's Station, Tennessee. Following his adoption, his name was legally changed to Trace Dempsey Cyrus.

Cyrus spent his school holidays touring and performing with Billy Ray. He has a younger sister, Miley, who starred in the Disney Channel original television series Hannah Montana. He recorded a track with her in 2008.

In 2006, he started working at a shopping mall in Burbank, California, and dropped out of La Cañada High School.

Career

2006–2010: Metro Station 

In 2006, Cyrus co-wrote the song "Country Music Has the Blues" on Billy Ray's album Wanna Be Your Joe. The song features Loretta Lynn and George Jones. In early 2006, Cyrus started the pop-rock band Metro Station with Mason Musso, the brother of Hannah Montana cast member Mitchel. Cyrus performed with the band as a guitarist and vocalist. Columbia Records signed the band after seeing their MySpace page. Cyrus left Metro Station in early 2010. 

In 2008, Cyrus was featured on the song "Hovering" on the deluxe edition of Miley's album, Breakout. The same year, he appeared in the music video for the Billy Ray single "Somebody Said a Prayer". In 2010, he was featured in the song "Alive" for Billy Ray's band, Brother Clyde.

2010–2017: Ashland HIGH, return to Metro Station 

In early 2010, Cyrus formed the pop band Ashland HIGH. In 2012, Ashland HIGH joined Breathe Carolina and the Ready Set on a co-headlining US tour. As of 2013, Ashland HIGH has released two albums, Geronimo and Drugstore Cowboy. In 2013, he was featured in a remix of the song "Dat Boi" by Millionaires.

In August 2014, Cyrus returned as a member of Metro Station. The band released their second studio album Savior in 2015 and toured with Never Shout Never and Falling in Reverse from 2015–2016.

2017–present: Solo career 
In 2017, Cyrus began to release music independently and released his first single "Lights Out" that year. He released his first EP Killing the Pain on September 24, 2021.

Personal life 
From 2010 into 2017, Cyrus had an on-and-off relationship with actress Brenda Song, to whom he was engaged in 2011.

Cyrus has many tattoos, some of which he displayed for PETA's "Ink Not Mink" anti-fur campaign in 2012.

Discography

Extended plays

Singles

References

External links 

Trace Cyrus on Myspace

1989 births
American rock guitarists
American male guitarists
American rock singers
American rock songwriters
American male songwriters
Columbia Records artists
Trace
Living people
Musicians from Ashland, Kentucky
American adoptees
21st-century American singers
Musicians from Appalachia
Singers from Kentucky
Songwriters from Kentucky
Rock musicians from Kentucky
21st-century American guitarists
Guitarists from Kentucky
21st-century American male singers